Henry Martyn-Clark (Peshawar, c. 1857 - Edinburgh, April 1916) was an Afghan-born adopted British medical missionary stationed in Amritsar in the late 19th century.

Biography 
Clark was born to Afghan parents, and was adopted after his mother's death by Elizabeth and Rev. Robert Clark in 1859. It is thought that he was named Henry Martyn after the Anglican missionary to Persia and India. Clark was educated at the University of Edinburgh (MB, CM 1881) and received his MD in 1892. In 1881 he was accepted by the Church Missionary Society to start the Amritsar Medical Mission as a Medical Missionary. He left for Amritsar to join his father on 4 February 1882. The same year he married his wife Mary Emma.

In Amritsar Clark gained a reputation as a Christian debater and pamphlet writer, on Islam and Hinduism. He participated in a famous 15-day debate with Mirza Ghulam Ahmad, the founder of the Ahmadiyya Community. This was later published by the Ahmadiyya community in Urdu as Jang e muqqadas (the Holy War).

On 1 August 1897, Henry Martyn-Clark filed a lawsuit of attempted murder against Mirza Ghulam Ahmad with Deputy Commissioner Montagu William Douglas in Ludhiana. Clark stated that Ahmad had sent a youth named Abdul Hamid to murder him. A version of events is included in the biography A life of Ahmad by the Ahmadi Imam of Fazl Mosque London, A. R. Dard. Based on Douglas' investigation of the youth's testimony the charges against Ahmad were dropped. In his book Kitab ul Baryyah (An Account of Exoneration)  Mirza Ghulam Ahmad has narrated the details of the case.

He was editor in chief of the Dictionary of the Punjab, and wrote a biography of his adoptive father, Robert Clark of The Panjab: Pioneer and Missionary Statesman. He retired to Edinburgh in 1905 where he lectured in tropical diseases. 

He is buried in the Dean Cemetery in Edinburgh. His birth date on the stone is 19 September 1859 and the death date is 10 April 1916. The inscription reads "Physician to both soul and body" He was survived by his wife Mary Emma Ireland, and their sons Walter Ireland Foggo Martyn-Clark and Robert Eric Noel Martyn-Clark. Their sons were both born in Amritsar and like their father studied medicine at  the University of Edinburgh.

References

1857 births
1916 deaths
Christian medical missionaries
Alumni of the University of Edinburgh
Academics of the University of Edinburgh
Protestant missionaries in India
British Protestant missionaries